Richard Lyng could refer to:

Richard Lyng (archdeacon), Fourteenth Century English archdeacon
Richard Edmund Lyng (1918–2003), former United States Secretary of Agriculture